The Okhotnykovo Solar Power Station is a Photovoltaic power station in Crimea with installed capacity of 82,65 megawatts (MW). , it is the world's 6th largest solar plant and the second largest PV station in central and eastern Europe.  The power station is located at Okhotnykovo in Crimea, Ukraine and was developed by the Austrian company Activ Solar. The first and second phases of the project were commissioned in July 2011, the third and fourth in October 2011.

The park comprises 360,000 modules, generating around 100 GWh of electricity per year, enough to meet the needs of 20,000 households.  The larger capacity is installed in the plants in Perovo (Ukraine, 100 MW), Sarnia Canada (97 MW) and Montalto di Castro Italy (84.2 MW).

The solar power plant is part of the Ukraine's National Natural Energy Project which is aiming to reduce Crimea's dependence on mainland Ukraine for energy.  The State Agency of Ukraine for Energy Efficiency and Energy Conservation launched the project in 2010 in the hope of attracting investors to the reputed high solar radiation area, which reaches a capacity of 800-1450 W/m2.

See also 

List of photovoltaic power stations

References 

Photovoltaic power stations in Ukraine